Fondettes is a commune in the suburbs of Tours in the Indre-et-Loire department in the Centre-Val de Loire region.

Population

Mayors of Fondettes

1944-1945: René Vernier
1945-1959: Ernest Dupuis
1959-1971: Marcel Chauvin
1971-1993: Jean Roux
1993-1995: Jean-Paul Leduc
1995-2001: Joseph Masbernat
2001-2008: Michel Pasquier
2008-2014: Gérard Garrido
2014- : Cédric de Oliveira

International relations

Fondette is twinned with:
 Wiesbaden, Naurod, Hesse, Germany
 Constancia, Santarém (district), Portugal.

Architectural Heritage

See also
Communes of the Indre-et-Loire department

References

External links

 Official Website 
 Site of the Communauté d'Agglomération of Tours 

Communes of Indre-et-Loire